Lake Lovering is a lake located in the Memphrémagog Regional County Municipality of the Estrie region of Quebec, Canada. It is located south of the city of Magog.

Lake Lovering is contaminated with polychlorinated biphenyl (PCB), dioxins and furans. These chemicals originated through a small stream retrieving water from a landfill.

In 1970 concerned landowners created an organization, la Société de conservation du lac Lovering, in response to the consequences of rapid residential urbanization of the lake shore. Its goal is to raise awareness of the hazards to the lake to local residents and authorities.

References

Lakes of Estrie